Beltany may refer to:

Beltany, County Tyrone, two townlands in County Tyrone, Northern Ireland
Beltany, County Donegal, a townland in County Donegal, Ireland
Beltany stone circle, a neolithic stone circle in County Donegal, Ireland
Beltany, an alternative spelling of the Beltane Gaelic May Day festival